Proprioseiopsis inflatus is a species of mite in the family Phytoseiidae.

References

inflatus
Articles created by Qbugbot
Animals described in 1965